Keith Stokes (born December 10, 1978) is a former professional Canadian and American football wide receiver. Stokes was a two time Canadian Football League all star. He also starred in the French League Championnat Élite Division 1 in 2009 for the Elancourt Templiers. He has been a football coach in recent years.

College career
Stokes attended Georgia Military College and as a sophomore, he was selected as an NJCAA All-American honoree and was named the Team MVP.
Stokes attended East Carolina University where he immediately made his mark as a talented kick returner and big-play offensive weapon.  In the fourth game of his career for the Pirates, he caught the game-winning 27-yard touchdown pass to defeat the #13 ranked Miami Hurricanes by a score of 27–23.  The Pirates were down 20–3 at halftime in the emotional comeback victory, which was moved to Raleigh from ECU's campus in Greenville, NC, due to the after-effects of Hurricane Floyd.

Stokes set East Carolina Pirates team records as a punt returner.  Stokes gained the most punt return yards in a single game with 168 in a 62–20 victory against Houston on November 11, 2000.  He also possesses the best career average yards per punt return at 15.5 yards per return on 53 returns.  His 94-yard punt return against Cincinnati in 1999 is the second-longest in school history.  Stokes also returned a punt 71 yards for a touchdown against Texas Tech in the 2000 Galleryfurniture.com Bowl.

Although relatively short for the receiver position, as a senior, he was able to utilize his agility and quickness to routinely create separation from defenders to lead the team in receptions and receiving yards.  In 2000, Stokes led Conference USA in all-purpose yardage with 1,427 yards.

Professional career
Stokes began his pro football career in the Canadian Football League. In 2002, Stokes joined the Montreal Alouettes and, in 2004, Stokes joined the Winnipeg Blue Bombers, won the John Agro Special Teams Award, and was named a 2004 CFL All-Star.

Stokes made the TSN CFL Play of The Year on his August 13, 2005, touchdown vs. the Hamilton Tiger-Cats. It was a 67-yard reception TD from Blue Bombers quarterback Kevin Glenn.

On September 29, 2008, Stokes was signed to return to the Toronto Argonauts and was released in February 2009.

In March 2009, Stokes was signed to the Elancourt Templiers, French team in the  Ligue Élite de Football Américain. For his first drive in EFL he scored a touchdown. The Templiers finished the French league season with a 7-3 record and lost in the playoffs semi final to the Thonon Black Panthers.

In 2011, Stokes signed and played for the Philadelphia Soul of the Indoor Football League. For the 2012 IFL season he signed to play with the Reading Express.

References

External links
 Toronto Argonauts profile

1978 births
Living people
American football wide receivers
American players of Canadian football
BC Lions coaches
Canadian football return specialists
Canadian football wide receivers
East Carolina Pirates football players
Edmonton Elks players
Manchester Wolves players
Montreal Alouettes players
Sportspeople from Toms River, New Jersey
Toronto Argonauts players
Winnipeg Blue Bombers players
Canadian Football League Rookie of the Year Award winners
Lehigh Valley Steelhawks players
Reading Express players
Philadelphia Soul players
Harrisburg Stampede players
Central Penn Capitals players
Players of American football from New Jersey
American expatriate players of American football
American expatriate sportspeople in France